"Oh Yeah" is the second single from hip hop duo GD & TOP's 2010 self-entitled album. It features YG Entertainment label-mate Park Bom. Released through YG Entertainment, the song was released alongside "High High in December 2010.  The song was a commercial success, peaking at the No. 2 position on the Gaon Music Chart, becoming the duo's highest peak on the chart, and selling over a million copies.

Background 
In an attempt to create their own style separate from their band, Big Bang, the duo opted for a more hip-hop sound as GD & TOP to contrast the group's current genre of electronic music. Release simultaneously as "High High," "Oh Yeah" have been described as a "club song" due to its "beat drop"; Bom's vocal was also praised. The duo have explained that "Oh Yeah" lyrically explores the theme of freedom. A Japanese version was released the following year.

Chart performance

Sales

Music program awards

References

External links 

 

2010 singles
2010 songs
Songs written by G-Dragon
G-Dragon songs
YG Entertainment singles
Songs written by T.O.P
Songs written by Teddy Park